William Cobb may refer to:
 William Cobb (designer), designer and engineer of rollercoasters
 William J. Cobb, best known as Happy Humphrey, the heaviest professional wrestler of all time
 William Cobb (photographer), British photographer
 William T. Cobb (1857–1937), Governor of Maine, 1905–1909
 William Jelani Cobb (born 1967),  American author and educator
 William Montague Cobb (1906–1990), physical anthropologist
 William Cobb (Eureka character), a character on the American science fiction drama Eureka
 William Peyton Cobb (1880–1963), Secretary of State of Alabama
 Will D. Cobb (1876–1930), American lyricist and composer
 Willie Cobb (fl. 1908–1909), American baseball player
 Billy Cobb (born 1940), English former footballer active in the 1960s

See also
 Bill Cobbs (born 1934), American character actor